Rogério Oliveira da Silva (born 13 January 1998), known as Rogério, is a Brazilian professional footballer who plays as a left-back for Italian side Sassuolo.

Club career
After a season playing for the Primavera team of Juventus, Rogério returned to Sassuolo in August 2017 on a season-long loan deal. On 17 July 2018, Rogério was loaned out to Sassuolo once again, this time with an option to buy. The deal was turned permanent at the end of the 2018–19 season.

Career statistics

Club

References

1998 births
Living people
Brazilian footballers
Association football forwards
Serie A players
Sport Club Internacional players
Juventus F.C. players
U.S. Sassuolo Calcio players
Brazilian expatriate footballers
Brazilian expatriate sportspeople in Italy
Expatriate footballers in Italy